is a professional Japanese baseball player. He plays pitcher for the Tokyo Yakult Swallows.

External links

 NPB.com

1985 births
Living people
Baseball people from Wakayama Prefecture
Japanese baseball players
Nippon Professional Baseball pitchers
Tokyo Yakult Swallows players
Japanese baseball coaches
Nippon Professional Baseball coaches